Afroclanis calcareus is a moth of the family Sphingidae. It is known from Brachystegia woodland from northern South Africa, Zimbabwe and Mozambique to Malawi, Zambia, the Democratic Republic of the Congo and Tanzania.

The length of the forewings is 29–32 mm for males and 34–36 mm for females and the wingspan is 68–76 mm. The forewings are reddish brown to brownish purple, with a large dark spot at the costa before the apex and a small dark stigma, The hindwings are brick red, usually darker at the margin.

References

Smerinthini
Moths described in 1907
Moths of Africa
Lepidoptera of Mozambique
Lepidoptera of Malawi
Lepidoptera of Tanzania
Insects of Zambia
Lepidoptera of Zimbabwe
Moths of Sub-Saharan Africa